Rudolf Flégr is a former slalom canoeist who competed for Czechoslovakia in the 1950s. He won two gold medals in the C-2 team event at the ICF Canoe Slalom World Championships, earning them in 1955 and 1957.

References

Czechoslovak male canoeists
Possibly living people
Year of birth missing (living people)
Medalists at the ICF Canoe Slalom World Championships